Pectoriloquy is the increased resonance of the voice through the lung structures, so that it is clearly comprehensible using a stethoscope on the chest. It usually indicates consolidation of the underlying lung parenchyma.

Types include egophony and bronchophony.

See also
Whispered pectoriloquy
Vocal fremitus

References

Symptoms and signs: Respiratory system
Audible medical signs